Aleksei Olegovich Volovik (born 27 April 1992) is a Russian football player who plays for Spartak Tambov.

Club career
He made his debut in the Russian Second Division for FC Spartak Tambov on 17 April 2012 in a game against FC Sokol Saratov.

References

External links
 
 
 

1992 births
Living people
Russian footballers
Footballers from Tambov
Association football defenders
Association football midfielders
Russian expatriate footballers
Expatriate footballers in Belarus
FC Spartak Tambov players
FC Rubin Yalta players
FC Volna Pinsk players
FC Sputnik Rechitsa players
FC Znamya Truda Orekhovo-Zuyevo players
FC Nosta Novotroitsk players
Russian Second League players
Belarusian Premier League players
Belarusian First League players